Jennifer Leigh Morse is a mathematician specializing in algebraic combinatorics. She is a professor of mathematics at the University of Virginia.

Research
Morse's interests in algebraic combinatorics include representation theory and applications to statistical physics, symmetric functions, Young tableaux, and -Schur functions, which are a generalization of Schur polynomials.

Education and career
Morse earned her Ph.D. in 1999 from the University of California, San Diego. Her dissertation, Explicit Expansions for Knop-Sahi and Macdonald Polynomials, was supervised by Adriano Garsia.

She has been a faculty member at the University of Pennsylvania, at the University of Miami, and at Drexel University before moving to the University of Virginia in 2017.

Book
Morse is one of six coauthors of the book -Schur Functions and Affine Schubert Calculus (Fields Institute Monographs 33, Springer, 2014).

Recognition
Morse was named a Simons Fellow in Mathematics in 2012 and again in 2021. She was elected as a Fellow of the American Mathematical Society in the 2021 class of fellows, "for contributions to algebraic combinatorics and representation theory and service to the mathematical community".

References

External links
Home page

Year of birth missing (living people)
Living people
20th-century American mathematicians
21st-century American mathematicians
American women mathematicians
Combinatorialists
University of California, San Diego alumni
University of Pennsylvania faculty
University of Miami faculty
Drexel University faculty
University of Virginia faculty
Fellows of the American Mathematical Society
20th-century American women
21st-century American women